Metamorfosi is a village in Chalkidiki regional unit of Central Macedonia, Greece. Since the 2011 local government reform it is part of the municipality Polygyros. It is located near a beach and a forest is near the village. It is a not so big village with about 400 residents. Although in the summer season it is full with tourists.

References

Populated places in Chalkidiki